An anti-corruption agency is a special police agency specialised in fighting political corruption and engaging in general anti-corruption activities. Most are founded by statute, but some have a constitutional status.

List

See also

References

 
Anti-corruption